Matlatzinca or Ocuiltec may refer to:
 Matlatzinca people, an ethnic group of Mexico
 Matlatzinca languages, a group of Oto-Manguean languages

Language and nationality disambiguation pages